Grosvenor Grammar School (formerly Grosvenor High School) is an 11–18 co-educational controlled grammar school and sixth form in Belfast, County Antrim, Northern Ireland.

History 
Grosvenor Grammar School was founded in 1945 as Grosvenor High School, by the Belfast Corporation, to cope with the increase in demand for grammar-school education in the area. It was sited in Roden Street, off Grosvenor Road, and remained there until 1958, when the school moved to Cameronian Drive in the east of the city. In 2010, the school moved to its present location, Marina Park.

Its headmasters have been William Moles (1945–1972), Ken Reid (1972–1993), John Lockett (1993–2008), and R. S. McLoughlin (2008–2014). On 19 December 2014 Robin McLoughlin made his final speech at Grosvenor before moving on to Banbridge Academy, making way for the school's first headmistress, Frances Vasey (2014−present).

In order to avoid confusion with non-grammar 'high schools', the school changed its name in 1993 to Grosvenor Grammar School.

In rugby, the school has won the Ulster Schools Cup once (in 1983). Grosvenor has also experienced major successes in the Ulster School's Cup for football, with recent wins in 2016 as well as 2017, with their first XI seeing off St Columb's of Derry by 3–2.

Notable alumni 
 Christopher J. H. Wright, theologian and author
 George Best, professional footballer
 Ivan Little, journalist and actor
 Nathan Connolly, musician
 Ross White, director and Academy Award and BAFTA winner for An Irish Goodbye (film)

Notable staff 
 Sammy Wilson, former economics teacher
 Michelle McIlveen, taught history and politics
 Willie Anderson, former PE teacher
 Kyle McCallan, teacher from 2005 to 2016, took a job in the PE department
 Andrew White, joined in September 2007

See also 
 List of grammar schools in Northern Ireland

References

External links 
 

Grammar schools in Belfast
Educational institutions established in 1945
1945 establishments in Northern Ireland